Labeo polli is a species of fish in the genus Labeo from the Congo Basin.
It is found only in the Kafubu River (Haut-Katanga) and the Kanshéle River (Kivu).

References 

polli
Cyprinid fish of Africa
Taxa named by Sinaseli-Marcel Tshibwabwa
Fish described in 1997
Endemic fauna of the Democratic Republic of the Congo